A radio noise source is a device that emits radio waves at a certain frequency, used to calibrate radio telescopes such that received data may be compared to a known value, as well as to find the focal point of a telescope soon after construction, so that the wave guide and front end may be properly located.

Noise